The United States holds its federal elections on the first Tuesday after the first Monday in November. The President of the United States is elected to a four-year term. Each of the 435 seats in the United States House of Representatives are elected to two-year terms. The 100 members in the United States Senate are elected to six-year terms, with one-third of them being renewed every two years.

Because of when these federal offices are up for election, the election years are commonly classified into the following three categories: 
 Presidential elections: Elections for the U.S. President are held every four years, coinciding with those for all 435 seats in the House of Representatives, and 33 or 34 of the 100 seats in the Senate. 
 Midterm elections: They occur two years after each presidential election. Elections are held for all 435 seats in the House of Representatives, and 33 or 34 seats in the Senate. As a result, the membership of these two legislative chambers changes near the midpoint of a president's four-year term of office
 Off-year elections: These are elections during odd-numbered years. Only special elections, if necessary, are held to fill vacant seats in the Senate and House of Representatives, usually either due to incumbents resigning or dying while in office.

The years in which elections are held for U.S. state and local offices vary between each jurisdiction. The vast majority of races held during off-year elections are at the city and local level, but many other city and local governments may instead hold their elections during even-numbered years to coincide with either the presidential or midterm elections.

List of elections by year

1788–1879
Each state originally set their own separate date for their congressional elections. Before the Twentieth Amendment to the United States Constitution was ratified in 1933, the date on which a Congress usually began was March 4 of the odd-numbered year instead of early January. Individual states could schedule congressional elections into January or February. The dates when Senate elections were held varied even more: before the Seventeenth Amendment was ratified in 1913, senators were chosen by state legislatures, which meant senate seats could remain vacant for months or years due to legislative deadlock.

1880–1911
Congress began to standardize House elections in 1872, and by 1880 every state had moved their regular House elections to even-numbered years. However, a state's Senate election continued to depend on whether its state legislature remained in gridlock.

1912–present
The 1914 midterm elections became the first year that all regular Senate elections were held in even-numbered years, coinciding with the House elections. The ratification of the Seventeenth Amendment to the United States Constitution in 1913 established the direct election of senators, instead of having them elected directly by state legislatures.

Other

References

External links
Election Statistics (by state within year) at the Office of the Clerk; also here 
Presidential Elections